A fellowship is a position in a learned society or professional association.

Fellowship or The Fellowship may also refer to:

Arts and entertainment
 Fellowship, subtitled Monthly Bulletin of the Aboriginal-Australian Fellowship, a bulletin of the Aboriginal-Australian Fellowship published in Sydney 1960–1968
 Fellowship (album), by Lizz Wright, 2010
  "Fellowship" (short story), by Franz Kafka
 The Fellowship, the protagonists in Tolkien's The Fellowship of the Ring
 Fellowship!, a musical stage play parody of The Fellowship of the Ring
 The Fellowship, a fictional group in the video game series Ultima

Places
 Fellowship, Florida, U.S.
 Fellowship, New Jersey, U.S.

Religion
 Fellowship, a term used in Anabaptism used for a Christian denomination
 Fellowship Church, a church in Grapevine, Texas, U.S.
 The Fellowship (Australia), a group within the Presbyterian Church of Australia
 The Fellowship (Canada), a conservative Baptist association
 The Fellowship (Christian organization), a U.S.-based religious and political organization 
 The Fellowship (FGFCMI), a fellowship of like-minded Pentecostal churches and ministers

Other uses
 Fellowship (medicine), a period of medical training
 Fellowship (racehorse) (fl. 2000s), a Hong Kong Thoroughbred racehorse
 Fokker F28 Fellowship, a twin engine jet airliner

See also 

 The Fellowship of the Ring (disambiguation)
 Koinonia, referring to communion, or fellowship within the Christian church

Fellowships